The East Fremantle Football Club, nicknamed the Sharks, is an Australian rules football club playing in the West Australian Football League (WAFL) and WAFL Women's (WAFLW). The team's home ground is East Fremantle Oval. East Fremantle are the most successful club in WAFL history, winning 29 premierships since their entry into the competition in 1898.

History

The East Fremantle Football Club was formed in 1898 and up to the end of the 2022 season the club has won 29 league premierships in the West Australian Football League. Making the club one of the most successful AFL football clubs in Australia. East Fremantle's last Premiership was in 1998 where they defeated West Perth, 2012 was their last appearance in a Grand Final was against Claremont.

With professionalism of teams in the goldfields attracting players away from Perth saw the Imperials collapse after 3 years in 1897, many of the players from that team would become part of the East Fremantle Football Club in 1898. In particular Tom Wilson and David (Dolly) Christy from the Imperials along with Sam Thomson were instrumental in the foundation East Fremantle Football club, Wilson as captain and Christy as Vice Captain would play in East Fremantle's first game at the WACA on 11 May 1898.

Tragedy would stike the East Fremantle football club in just 6th year with the death of prominent player James Gullan from accidental poisoning the day after their game against South Fremantle. During Gullans time at East Fremantle he became regarded as one of the best players to ever play the game.

East Fremantle has a fierce rivalry with its Port cousin, South Fremantle, and the Foundation Day Derby between the two sides is a much anticipated highlight of the local football calendar. East Fremantle's success has thus far eclipsed that of South Fremantle, who have won 14 WAFL premierships.

Up until 1987, Western Australia was immersed in WAFL culture and East Fremantle enjoyed a strong following. In 1987, a Perth-based club – the West Coast Eagles – joined an expanded Victorian Football League. West Coast's initial squad of 32 players included six East Fremantle players and they were coached by former East Fremantle premiership player and coach, Ron Alexander. Interest in the semi-national competition saw attendances at WAFL games start to fall, with severe consequences for the club's support base and finances. By the middle 2000s, East Fremantle was in severe trouble on and off the field, winning only nineteen of eighty matches between 2003 and 2006 and suffering severe financial difficulties, though since then the clubs has substantially recovered without winning a thirtieth premiership. The Sharks once pulled on average 10,000 people to a home game. Now 1,500 people to a home game is considered a strong attendance.

East Fremantle was a foundation member of the WAFL Women's competition in 2019. They were the inaugural premiers of the competition, defeating Swan Districts in the grand final.

Team of the Century

In 1997 the East Fremantle Football Club named its Team of the Century, to coincide with the club centenary celebrations.  The team includes many names that have become synonymous with East Fremantle.

Fremantle Team of Legends

In 2007 the East Fremantle and South Fremantle football clubs came together to select the Fremantle Team of Legends.
The Team consisted of players from East Fremantle and South Fremantle that had played at least 100 WAFL games for either Fremantle club.

Club song
The East Fremantle Football Club team song is sung to the tune of "Notre Dame Victory March". Its was adapted when the Club changed logos to the Sharks in 1983.

Cheer, Cheer the Blue and the White
Honour the Sharks by day and by night
Lift that loyal banner high
Shake down the thunder from the sky
Whether the odds be great or be small
We will go in and win over all
While our players keep on fighting
Onwards to victory

Historical statistics

Club honours

Club Records
Highest Score: Round 17, 1944 – 33.23 (221) vs. South Fremantle at Fremantle Oval

Lowest Score: Round 13, 1898 – 1.2 (8) vs. West Perth at The WACA

Greatest Winning Margin: Round 17, 1944 – 201 points vs. South Fremantle at Fremantle Oval

Greatest Losing Margin: Round 10, 1981 – 178 points vs. West Perth at Leederville Oval

Most games: Brian Peake 304 (1972–1981 & 1985–1989)

Most goals: George Doig 1111

Record Home Attendance: Round 3, 1979 – 21,317 vs. South Fremantle

Record Finals Attendance: 1979 Grand Final – 52,781 vs. South Fremantle at Subiaco Oval

Most consecutive victories: 35, between 28 July 1945 (Round 13) and 17 May 1947 (Round 3), including the 1945 and 1946 premierships

Most consecutive losses: 13, once between 18 May 1968 (Round 7) and 17 August 1968 (Round 19) and again between 11 April 1970 (Round 2) and 11 July 1970 (Round 14)

Players
There continue to be players from East Fremantle who move onto AFL/VFL, and AFLW playing careers, see List of East Fremantle footballers who have played in the VFL/AFL.

Individual honours 
Sandover Medal: (13 total) — Lin Richards (1931), Jim Conway (1950), Jack Clarke (1957), Ray Sorrell (1961, 1963), David Hollins (1971), Graham Melrose (1974), Brian Peake (1977), Murray Wrensted (1985), Craig Treleven (1995), Adrian Bromage (1998), Rory O'Brien (2013), Blaine Boekhorst (2022)

Simpson Medallists (in Grand Final): (10 total) — Alan Ebbs (1945), Frank Conway (1957), Ray Sorrell (1962), Norm Rogers (1964), Dave Imrie (1965), Gary Gibellini (1974),  Kevin Taylor (1979), Clinton Browning (1992), Mark Amaranti (1994), Adrian Bromage (1998)

Simpson Medallists (in State Game): (5 total) — Ray Sorrell (1962), Kevin Taylor (1982), Paul Harding (1991), Craig Treleven (1995), Rod Tregenza (1999)

Bernie Naylor Medallists: (20 total) — Ernest Kelly (1904, 38 goals), Henry Sharpe (1905, 50 goals), Henry Sharpe (1907, 48 goals), Charles Doig (1908, 26 goals), Charles Doig (1909, 38 goals), Arthur Rawlinson (1917, 46 goals), Joseph Lawn (1919, 55 goals), Dinney Coffey (1923, 36 goals), George Doig (1933, 106 goals), George Doig (1934, 152 goals), George Doig (1935, 113 goals), George Doig (1936, 109 goals), George Doig (1937, 144 goals), George Doig (1941, 141 goals), George Prince (1949, 82 goals), Bob Johnson (1966, 92 goals), Kevin Taylor (1979, 102 goals), Neil Lester-Smith (1989, 90 goals), Rod Tregenza (1999, 86 goals), Rod Tregenza (2000, 86 goals)

Prendergast Medallists: (9 total) — Bill Taggart (1954), 1977: Joe Angel, 1978: Kevin Taylor, 1994: Jon Stagg, 2002: Leigh Willison, 2007: Morgan Cooper, 2008: Conor Davidson, 2010: James Murray, Timothy Viney (2011), Benjamin Harding (2017)

Jack Clarke Medal: (5 total) — Mark Amaranti (1985), Graham Ralph (1989), Matthew Cremin (2000), Andrew Green (2001), Jacob Green (2013)

Chesson Medallists: (2 total) — Greg Brown (1972), Doug Winning (1973)

All-Australian team: Jack Clarke (1953, 1956, 1958, 1961), Alan Preen (1958), Norm Rogers (1958), Ray Sorrell (1958, 1961), Brian Peake (1979 (c), 1980, 1986 (c)), Tony Buhagiar (1979), Kevin Taylor (1983), Peter Wilson (1986)

Tassie Medal: Brian Peake (1979)

2022 squad

Premiership teams

Australian Football Hall of Fame

The Australian Football Hall of Fame was established in 1996.

Ten former East Fremantle players have been inducted: David Christy (1996), William "Nipper" Truscott (1996), Jack Clarke (1999), Jack Sheedy (2001), George Doig (2002), Steve Marsh (2006), Bob Johnson (2012), Brian Peake (2013), Ray Sorrell (2016), Simon Black (2020). East Fremantle's 1974 premiership coach, John Todd, was inducted in 2003.

West Australian Football Hall of Fame
The West Australian Football Hall of Fame was created in 2002 and the first induction took place in 2004.

Twenty-two former East Fremantle players and coaches have been inducted: Ron Alexander (2004), Simon Black (2017), David Christy (2004), Jack Clarke (2004), Charles Doig (2017), George Doig (2004), Jerry Dolan (2004), Doug Green (2006), Paul Hasleby (2015), Percy Johnson (2010), Chris Mainwaring (2005), Steve Malaxos (2005), Steve Marsh (2004), Gerard Neesham (2005), Brian Peake (2004), Con Regan (2015), Norm Rogers (2004), Jack Sheedy (2004), Ray Sorrell (2004), John Todd (2004), William "Nipper" Truscott (2004) and Shane Woewodin (2022).

Five have been elevated to Legend status: George Doig (2004), John Todd (2004), William "Nipper" Truscott (2004), Steve Marsh (2005) and Jack Sheedy (2005).

EFFC Hall of Fame

On Saturday 2 June 2012, the East Fremantle Football Club inducted 52 individuals into the inaugural East Fremantle Football Club Hall of Fame. Nine inductees were also given 'Legend' status. Only Players, Officials and Volunteers that served the club between 1898 and 1986 were deemed worthy to be inducted.

Roll of honour
At the outbreak of World War I many players from Western Australia enlisted in the armed services, East Fremantle Football Club players killed in action include:
 Corporal Percy Sutherland MOFFLIN (10th Light Horse), KIA, Gallipoli, 16 June 1915
 Private Roy James 'Nugget' WRIGHTSON (11th Battn), KIA, Armentières, 30 May 1916
 Private John Alexander Robertson 'Hooky' DOIG (44th Battn), KIA, Messines, 31 July 1917
 Gunner John 'Jack' McCARTHY (36th Heavy Artillery), KIA, Ypres, 4 October 1917
 Private Arthur Henry 'Cock' WRIGHTSON (48th Battn), KIA, Passchendaele, 12 October 1917

See also
Wikipedia listing of East Fremantle Football Club players

References and notes

External links

 
 Club Profile at Australian Football
 WAFL site for East Fremantle Football Club

 
West Australian Football League clubs
WAFL Women's
Sport in Fremantle
Australian rules football clubs in Western Australia
Australian rules football clubs established in 1898
1898 establishments in Australia
Sporting clubs in Perth, Western Australia
Town of East Fremantle